Anatoly Ivanovich Lukyanov (7 May 1930 – 9 January 2019) was a Russian Communist politician who was the Chairman of the Supreme Soviet of the USSR between 15 March 1990 and 4 September 1991. One of the founders of the Communist Party of the Russian Federation (CPRF) in 1993, he was described by its leader Gennady Zyuganov as having been the Deng Xiaoping of the party. He published books of poetry under his own name and under the pseudonyms Osenev (Осенев) and Dneprov (Днепров).

Lukyanov was an early political ally of Mikhail Gorbachev, supporting his efforts in issues such as the fight against corruption and the start of reforms in the economy. However, beginning in 1987–1988, he increasingly sympathized with the party establishment, correctly foreseeing that Gorbachev's policies would lead to the Soviet collapse.

Early life 
Lukyanov was born in Smolensk on 7 May 1930, the son of a Red Army officer who was killed in action during World War II. He graduated from the Law School of the Moscow State University in 1953, while also being a member of the Communist Youth League (Komsomol). During his years in law school, he befriended Mikhail Gorbachev, who was also studying there at the time, becoming an early political ally of the future leader. He went on to earn a post-graduate degree in Constitutional Law and a PhD in Public Law.

Early career 
From 1956 to 1961 Lukyanov worked as a legal adviser at the Legal Commission of the Soviet Council of Ministers. He later was an adviser on legislation-drafting at the Supreme Soviet and worked on constitutional law issues at the Central Committee. He also served as a constitutional adviser to the governments of the People's Republic of Poland and the Hungarian People's Republic. All the while he benefited from being constantly based in Moscow, at the center of government.

Political career 
In 1975-77 he worked on drafting the 1977 Soviet Constitution, which replaced the 1936 Soviet Constitution. From 1977 till 1983 he was Chief of the Secretariat of the Supreme Soviet of the USSR. He was also a leading member of the powerful Central Auditing Commission. Lukyanov was a secretary of the CPSU Central Committee from January 1987 and a candidate member of the Politburo from September 1988.

Lukyanov was elected vice-chairman of the Supreme Soviet of the Soviet Union in March 1989, and chairman the following year. In 1991, Ivan Silayev accused him of being the leading force behind the Soviet coup attempt of 1991. Lukyanov was arrested on 29 August 1991, and held for fifteen months on charges of conspiracy. On September 4, he was relieved of his post as speaker of the union parliament. Throughout the investigation, Lukyanov denied complicity.

Lukyanov was the Chairman of the Central Advisory Council of the Communist Party of the Russian Federation, and the senior adviser to party leader Gennady Zyuganov, since co-founding the party in 1993.

Lukyanov was elected as a deputy to the first three State Dumas of the Russian Federation (1993, 1995 and 1999). His last political position was as Chairman of the Duma Committee on Constitutional Law. He did not participate in the elections of 2003 and instead became a board member of the company OEG Petroservis.

Death 
Lukyanov was found dead in his Moscow home on 9 January 2019, at the age of 88, after suffering from an unspecified illness. He was buried at Troyekurovskoye Cemetery in Moscow on 11 January.

Legacy 
The Lukyanov Doctrine in Russian academic parlance may bear a striking resemblance to the Karaganov Doctrine.

References

External links 
Biography 
Biography 
Examples of his poetry 

1930 births
2019 deaths
Moscow State University alumni
People from Smolensk
Communist Party of the Soviet Union members
Russian communists
Russian male poets
Soviet politicians
Politburo of the Central Committee of the Communist Party of the Soviet Union candidate members
Members of the Supreme Soviet of the Soviet Union
People of the 1991 Soviet coup d'état attempt
Communist Party of the Russian Federation members
Burials in Troyekurovskoye Cemetery
First convocation members of the State Duma (Russian Federation)
Second convocation members of the State Duma (Russian Federation)
Third convocation members of the State Duma (Russian Federation)